IsraAID (The Israel Forum for International Humanitarian Aid) is an Israel-based non-governmental organization that responds to emergencies all over the world with targeted humanitarian help. This includes disaster relief, from search and rescue to rebuilding communities and schools, to providing aid packages, medical assistance, and post-psychotrauma care. IsraAID has also been involved in an increasing number of international development projects with focuses on agriculture, medicine, and mental health.

Purpose 
IsraAID was founded in 2001 by Mully Dor, and Shachar Zahavi  with the purpose of bringing together Israeli and Jewish aid organizations with expertise in the fields required to provide humanitarian aid in the wake of a disaster.

The organization's stated goal is to "improve and expand international humanitarian assistance activities provided from Israel through cooperation between Israeli aid organizations."

Structure and funding 
IsraAID was founded as an umbrella organization consisting of Jewish and Israeli search and rescue, medical and relief groups that provide aid worldwide to people in need, regardless of race, religion, nationality or disability. Today, it is an independent humanitarian aid agency and has worked on emergency response and long-term development projects in more than 50 countries worldwide. The group's CEO is Yotam Polizer and its global chair is Meira Aboulafia.

IsraAID is privately funded by individual Israeli and North American donors.

Projects 
2004 - In 2004 Israel sent 150 army doctors and search and rescue teams to tsunami victims in Sri Lanka, but since Sri Lanka declined that offer, Israel instead sent a smaller number of IDF personnel along with an 82-ton planeload of relief supplies, including blankets, food, water, baby food and over nine tons of medicine. The relief effort was coordinated by IsraAID.

2005 - Israel provided tsunami crisis relief for Sri Lanka "spearheaded" by IsraAID. A humanitarian team of 14 medical and logistical personnel was sent to Sri Lanka to help those affected by the tsunami.

2007 - IsraAID sent six doctors and nurses to Peru to assist in rescue efforts and provide medical care after a major earthquake.

2007 - Israeli volunteers went to a refugee camp on the Kenyan-Somalian border to provide relief for Muslim refugees in Somalia. The Jerusalem AIDS Project, an Israeli organization under the umbrella of IsraAID which promotes HIV/AIDS education and prevention, distributed clothes for infants and toddlers. Later they would meet with IsraAID in order to purchase basic medical equipment.

2008 - B'nai B'rith International, one of the founding members of IsraAID and in partnership with IsraAID, provided thousands of meals to an estimated 35,000 Georgian war refugees.

2008 - Israeli aid teams went to Myanmar to help with recovery after a major cyclone. According to the Jerusalem Post:

The IsraAID organization, which sends help to foreign countries in need, will be sending to Myanmar a highly trained search-and-rescue team and a 10-member team of doctors and nurses. The teams will bring with them crucial supplies, including plastic sheeting, food, household appliances and water filters.

2009 - IsraAID sent six volunteer doctors, nurses and paramedics to the Philippines to assist Operation Blessing International after two devastating typhoons.

2010 - In response to the earthquake in Haiti, IsraAID sent a 15-person search-and-rescue team, which includes emergency medical staff to Haiti. The IsraAID team set up treatment rooms to treat the injured at the collapsed main hospital in Port-au-Prince, as well as outside the city in a makeshift clinic in a football stadium, and has helped coordinate relief supply logistics. In February, IsraAID opened a child education center in February in the Pétion-Ville refugee camp, the largest refugee camp in Port-au-Prince area, together with other agencies, such as Operation Blessing. The center was set up initially in the tents from the IDF’s field hospital.

2012 - In March 2012, IsraAID helped South Sudan set up its Ministry of Social Development to provide social services to the population after decades of war and hardship.

2014 - In July 2014, IsraAID sent a team to Washington State to help in the recovery effort after the biggest wildfire in Washington State's history that consumed some 400 square miles and approximately 300 homes.

2016 - In August 2016, IsraAID sent a 20-member staff of search and rescue, relief and trauma specialists to the site of the August 2016 Central Italy earthquake, becoming the only foreign aid organization on the ground.

2019 - In March 2019, IsraAID sent personnel to Mozambique to assist in the recovery from Cyclone Idai. Personnel were prepared to offer medical supplies, relief supplies, and psychological care to people affected by the storm. Personnel were also prepared to help restore access to safe water.

See also 
Mashav
Heroes for life

References

External links 
 

Charities based in Israel
Humanitarian aid organizations